The Naval Aircraft Factory XN5N was a prototype United States  monoplane  trainer aircraft produced by the Naval Aircraft Factory in Philadelphia, Pennsylvania in 1941. A single prototype was built and evaluated.

The type was not placed in production.

Specifications (XN5N-1)

See also

References

External links

NN5, Naval Aircraft Factory
N5N
Single-engined tractor aircraft
Low-wing aircraft
Aircraft first flown in 1941